Exorista larvarum is a Palaearctic species of fly in the family Tachinidae.

Hosts
Lepidoptera larvae, mainly Lymantriidae and Lasiocampidae. It attacks Lymantria dispar dispar. Studies have been conducted into its ability to successfully prey on Mythimna unipuncta and Cydalima perspectalis.

Parasitic nature 

It lays an egg on its host. The egg hatches and the larva penetrates the host. The host could escape this fate by molting before the egg hatches.

Artificial Diets 

For rearing Exorista larvarum in controlled conditions, inexpensive diets are preferable. MEYS contains liquid skimmed milk, chicken egg yolk, yeast extract and saccharose and HEYS contains veal homogenate, chicken egg yolk, yeast extract and saccharose. Though many variations of the diet yield different results. Larvae have a tendency to wander, which can result in starvation, reducing wander is important for maximizing yields.

References

Exoristinae
Diptera of Europe
Flies described in 1758
Taxa named by Carl Linnaeus